Croissant Club de Sig, known as CC Sig for short, is an Algerian football club located in Sig, Algeria, Algeria. The club was founded in 1926. They currently play in the Ligue Nationale du Football Amateur.

References

Football clubs in Algeria
Association football clubs established in 1926
1926 establishments in Algeria
Sports clubs in Algeria